Two men's club throw events were held at the 2021 World Para Athletics European Championships in Bydgoszcz, Poland.

Medalists

See also
List of IPC world records in athletics

References

Club throw
2021 in men's athletics
Club throw at the World Para Athletics European Championships